Mark Bakewell (born 11 December 1963) is an Australian rugby union forwards coach.  Bakewell has traveled extensively in a coaching career spanning over 20 years; he has coached Eastern Suburbs and Melbourne Rebels in Australia; Brive and Béziers in France; the Tongan national team; Suntory Sungoliath in Japan; as well as Bath, Bristol and Leicester Tigers in England.

Early life and playing career
Bakewell was born in Christchurch, New Zealand, and began playing rugby aged four before moving to Australia at seven.  He played around 400 games for Eastern Suburbs in Sydney at prop and in the backrow.  In 1996 he became an Australian citizen.

Coaching career
Bakewell began his coaching career at Eastern Suburbs, his old club, as a forwards and strength and conditioning coach in 1995. In 2001 he joined CA Brive as head coach in France's Pro D2, he led them to promotion in 2003 but then left following a contract dispute to join AS Béziers.

Following three seasons with Béziers Bakewell joined Bath in July 2006 as forwards coach under Steve Meehan.  He has described the three years he spent at Bath as his favourite job, with Bath finishing in the title play off positions in both 2008 and 2009. He later returned to Australia to be forwards coach to the Melbourne Rebels in Super Rugby.

In 2012 he joined  as forwards coach and was part of the coaching team when Tonga beat  in Scotland.  In 2014 he returned to Eastern Suburbs as head coach but quickly moved on in April to Japan joining Suntory Sungoliath.  After a season in Japan, In February 2016, Bakewell returned to England to replace Steve Borthwick at Bristol in England's second division.  While at Bristol Bakewell saw the side promoted in 2016 but then relegated from Premiership Rugby the following year.

On 14 February 2018 Bakewell joined Leicester Tigers to work as forwards coach under fellow Australian Matt O'Connor.

BBC Radio Leicester reported that Bakewell has left his role on 10 December 2019, with the club eventually confirming his departure on 18 December.

References

Living people
1963 births
Australian rugby union coaches
Australian rugby union players
Australian expatriate sportspeople in England
Leicester Tigers coaches